Elena Isabella Tedesco Bardi (born October 15, 1991, in San Salvador, El Salvador) is a Salvadoran beauty queen who won the Nuestra Belleza Mundo El Salvador pageant in 2009. She is daughter of an entrepreneur Salvadoran mother and Italian diplomatic father.

She is fluent in Spanish, English, French, Portuguese, and Italian.

Nuestra Belleza El Salvador Mundo 2009
Elena Tedeso was crowned Nuestra Belleza Mundo El Salvador 2009 on August 28, 2009, at Telecorporación Salvadoreña studios in San Salvador with the participation of 14 delegates. Elena at the time was 17 years with a height of 1.65 m.

Miss World 2009
Elena participated in the 59th Miss World pageant, was held on December 12, 2009, at the Gallagher Convention Centre in Johannesburg, South Africa.

References

External links
Official Nuestra Belleza El Salvador website
Entrevista con Elena Tedesco

1991 births
Living people
Miss World 2009 delegates
Nuestra Belleza El Salvador
Salvadoran beauty pageant winners
Salvadoran people of Italian descent
People from San Salvador